Hakan Cengiz (born 10 October 1967) is a Turkish football coach and former professional player.

References

External links

1967 births
Living people
German people of Turkish descent
Turkish footballers
German footballers
Association football forwards
2. Bundesliga players
FC Bremerhaven players
Atlas Delmenhorst players
Eintracht Frankfurt players
SV Waldhof Mannheim players
Kickers Emden players
SV Wilhelmshaven players
VfB Oldenburg players